Chen Yi (born 1 June 1997) is a Chinese footballer currently playing for China League One club Sichuan Jiuniu.

Career statistics

Club

Notes

References

1997 births
Living people
Chinese footballers
Chinese expatriate footballers
Association football midfielders
Campeonato de Portugal (league) players
Liga Portugal 2 players
China League One players
Changchun Yatai F.C. players
C.D. Mafra players
C.D. Cova da Piedade players
G.D. Tourizense players
Heilongjiang Ice City F.C. players
Sichuan Jiuniu F.C. players
Chinese expatriate sportspeople in Portugal
Expatriate footballers in Portugal